Bovolenta is a comune (municipality) in the Province of Padua in the Italian region Veneto, located about  southwest of Venice and about  southeast of Padua.

Bovolenta borders the following municipalities: Brugine, Candiana, Cartura, Casalserugo, Polverara, Pontelongo, Terrassa Padovana.

Demographic evolution

References

External links
 www.comune.bovolenta.pd.it/

Cities and towns in Veneto